Sandersdorf-Brehna is a town in the district of Anhalt-Bitterfeld, in Saxony-Anhalt, Germany. It is situated southwest of Bitterfeld. The town was formed by the merger of the previously independent town Brehna and the municipalities Glebitzsch, Petersroda, Roitzsch and Sandersdorf, on 1 July 2009.

Geography
The town Sandersdorf-Brehna consists of the following Ortschaften or municipal divisions:

Brehna
Glebitzsch
Heideloh
Petersroda
Ramsin
Renneritz
Roitzsch
Zscherndorf

Population development

Local council 
The local council has 28 members, elections were held in May 2014.

Steffi Syska was elected mayor in October 2021. She succeeded Andy Grabner, who had been re-elected in April 2015 with 91.4% of the votes for a second term.

Sons and daughters of the town
 Johann Gottfried Schnabel (pseudonym:  Gisander ; 1692-between 1751 and 1758), author of the Enlightenment
 Kurt Waitzmann (1905-1985), film actor and voice actor
 Dieter Engelhardt (born 1938), football player
 Horst Jankhöfer (born 1942), handball player
 Werner Peter (born 1950), footballer

References

 
Anhalt-Bitterfeld